United Church Of Madrid, formerly the First Congregational Church of Madrid, is a historic church in Madrid, St. Lawrence County, New York. The building dates from 1807.

First Congregational Church and the Madrid Methodist Church decided to merge in 1974. The combined congregation is affiliated with both the United Church of Christ and the United Methodist Church. It worships in the former Congregational Church building.  The Methodist congregation in Madrid formed in 1837 from the Canton Methodist circuit. It was originally based in Buck's Bridge, but relocated to Madrid by 1847 because many of the congregants lived in Madrid.

The First Congregational Church and Parsonage were listed on the New York State Register of Historic Places and National Register of Historic Places in 2010. When the churches merged, the window was moved to the Congregational Church and installed in the newly built Sunday School wing. A restoration of the window was completed in 2012.

References

External links
Madrid United Church

Churches on the National Register of Historic Places in New York (state)
United Church of Christ churches in New York (state)
United Methodist churches in New York (state)
Churches in St. Lawrence County, New York
National Register of Historic Places in St. Lawrence County, New York